The Julia Child Award is an annual award given out by the Julia Child Foundation for Gastronomy and the Culinary Arts to an individual or team that made a "profound and significant difference in how America cooks, eats, and drinks." It was established in 2015 in honor of the chef and television personality Julia Child who established the eponymous foundation in 1995.

Along with the recognition comes a $50,000 grant that the winner designates to a food-related nonprofit organization.

Recipients 

 2022 - Grace Young
 2021 – Toni Tipton-Martin
 2020 – Danielle Nierenberg
 2019 – José Andrés
 2018 – Mary Sue Milliken, Susan Feniger
 2017 – Danny Meyer
 2016 – Rick Bayless
 2015 – Jacques Pépin

References

External links
 

Food and drink awards
Awards established in 2015